Mārcis is a Latvian masculine given name and may refer to:
Mārcis Auziņš (born 1956), Latvian physicist
Mārcis Ošs (born 1991), Latvian footballer 
Mārcis Rullis (born 1979), Latvian bobsledder
Mārcis Štrobinders (born 1966), Latvian track and field athlete

References

Latvian masculine given names